The 2011-12 season was Dukla Prague's first season in the Gambrinus liga after they were promoted from the Czech 2. Liga during the previous season.

Pre-season
Six pre-season friendlies were announced, starting on 2 July 2011. This was just three weeks after Dukla played the final league match of the previous season.

As part of the warm-up programme, Dukla spent time in Nymburk. During the pre-season, Dukla gave trials to a number of players including midfielder Antonín Holub and Spaniard Juan Carlos Carretero Rodríguez.

Friendlies

Players

Squad information

Transfers 

Dukla lost striker Dani Chigou at the end of June, after his contract with the club ran out. He had been the top scorer of the Czech 2. Liga for the previous two seasons. In a bid to bring in a replacement, Serb Miroslav Marković, who had just finished the season as second-highest goalscorer behind Chigou, was signed on a three-year deal. The only other permanent signing made during the summer, as the club prepared for the top flight, was the two-year deal for midfielder Miroslav Podrazký. Podrazký himself had finished the previous season as the third-highest scorer behind Chigou and Marković.

In September, Dukla's front line was further boosted with the loan signing of Slovak striker Ivan Lietava until the end of the season.

During the winter break Tomáš Berger moved to Plzen on loan before Marek Hanousek signed a permanent deal with the same club. However according to the terms of Hanousek's deal, he could stay at Dukla "on loan" for the rest of the season. Defender Ondřej Švejdík extended his loan from Sparta until the end of the season. Players joining the club during the winter transfer window included forwards Vojtěch Engelmann and Josef Marek from FK Kunice, the latter on loan, and Croatian defender Tomislav Božić.

In

Out

Management and coaching staff

Source: fkdukla.cz

Statistics

Appearances and goals 

Starts + Substitute appearances.

|}

Goalscorers

Disciplinary Record

Home attendance

Gambrinus liga

Results by round

Results summary

League table

Matches

July

August

September

October

November

December

February

March

April

May

Cup 

As a Gambrinus liga team, Dukla entered the Cup at the second round stage. In the second round, it took until second half injury time in the away game at Sokol Brozany for Dukla to get on the scoresheet, courtesy of a Martin Jirouš strike, and thus avoid a potentially embarrassing penalty shootout. The third round match at Sokol Tasovice was more comfortably won, with two goals in each half securing progress. In the fourth round, up against Gambrinus liga competition for the first time in the form of Jablonec, Dukla lost by a single goal in the away game before winning 3-2 in the return leg at Juliska. The club therefore went out on the away goals rule. This was the second consecutive season that Dukla had been knocked out of the cup by Jablonec, having lost in the third round in the previous season.

References

Cited texts

Dukla Prague
FK Dukla Prague seasons